The 1995 MAAC men's basketball tournament was held March 4–6, 1995 at Knickerbocker Arena in Albany, New York.

Third-seeded  defeated Manhattan in the championship game, 80–78, to win their second MAAC men's basketball tournament.

The Peacocks received an automatic bid to the 1995 NCAA tournament.

Format
All eight of the conference's members participated in the tournament field. They were seeded based on regular season conference records.

Bracket

References

MAAC men's basketball tournament
1994–95 Metro Atlantic Athletic Conference men's basketball season